Hugo (Wilhelm) von Ziemssen (13 December 1829 – 21 January 1902) was a German physician, born in Greifswald.

He studied medicine at the universities of Greifswald, Berlin, and Würzburg. In 1863 he was called to the University of Erlangen as a professor of pathology and therapy as well as the director of the medical clinic. In 1874 he relocated to Munich as a professor and director of the general hospital.

He made advances in electrotherapeutics, conducted research on cold-water treatment for typhus and lung inflammation, and became an authority on diseases of the larynx and esophagus.

Terms 
Ziemssen's motor points—the places of entrance of motor nerves into muscles:  they are points of election in the therapeutical application of electricity to muscles.
Ziemssen's treatment—treatment of anemia by subcutaneous injections of defibrinated human blood.

Published works 
 Pharmacopoea Clinici Erlangensis : kurze Anleitung zur Ordination der wichtigsten Arzneimittel ; mit besonderer Rücksicht auf die Armenpraxis ; für klinische Praktikanten und angehende Armenärzte zusammengestellt . Besold, Erlangen 2. Aufl. 1874 Digital edition by the University and State Library Düsseldorf
Among other works he published "Klinische Vorträge" (1887–1900). In collaboration with prominent specialists, he published:
 "Handbuch der speciellen Pathologie und Therapie" (1874-1885, 28 volumes); translated into English and published as: "Cyclopaedia of the practice of medicine" (1874-81, 20 volumes); third German edition (16 volumes, 1886-88).
 "Handbuch der allgemeinen Therapie" (four volumes, 1880–84); translated into English and published as: "Handbook of general therapeutics" (1885–87).
From 1865 onwards, with Friedrich Albert von Zenker, he edited the journal "Deutsches Archiv für klinische Medizin".

References

External links 
 IDREF.fr Extensive bibliography of Ziemssen.

German internists

1829 births
1902 deaths
Academic staff of the University of Erlangen-Nuremberg
People from Greifswald
German male writers
University of Greifswald alumni